Rutgers University (RU), officially Rutgers, The State University of New Jersey, is a public land-grant research university consisting of four campuses in New Jersey.  Chartered in 1766, Rutgers was originally called Queen's College, and was affiliated with the Dutch Reformed Church. It is the eighth-oldest college in the United States, the second-oldest in New Jersey after Princeton University, and one of nine U.S. colonial colleges that were chartered before the American Revolution. 

In 1825, Queen's College was renamed Rutgers College in honor of Colonel Henry Rutgers, whose substantial gift to the school had stabilized its finances during a period of uncertainty. For most of its existence, Rutgers was a private liberal arts college but it has evolved into a coeducational public research university after being designated The State University of New Jersey by the New Jersey Legislature via laws enacted in 1945 and 1956.

Rutgers today has four distinct campuses: Rutgers University–New Brunswick, including grounds in adjacent Piscataway; Rutgers University–Newark; Rutgers University–Camden; and Rutgers Biomedical and Health Sciences. The university has additional facilities throughout the state, including oceanographic research facilities at the Jersey Shore.

Rutgers is a land-grant, sea-grant, and space-grant university, as well as the largest university in the state. Instruction is offered by 9,000 faculty members in 175 academic departments to over 45,000 undergraduate students and more than 20,000 graduate and professional students. The university is accredited by the Middle States Association of Colleges and Schools and is a member of the Big Ten Academic Alliance, the Association of American Universities and the Universities Research Association.

History

Colonial period

Two decades after the College of New Jersey (now known as Princeton University) was established in 1746 by the New Light Presbyterians, ministers of the Dutch Reformed Church, seeking autonomy in ecclesiastical affairs in the American colonies, sought to establish a college to train those who wanted to become ministers within the church. 

Through several years of effort by the Rev. Theodorus Jacobus Frelinghuysen (1691–1747) and Rev. Jacob Rutsen Hardenbergh (1736–1790), later the college's first president, Queen's College received its charter on November 10, 1766, from New Jersey's last royal governor, William Franklin (1730–1813), the illegitimate son of Founding Father Benjamin Franklin. The original charter established the college under the corporate name the trustees of Queen's College, in New-Jersey, named in honor of Queen Charlotte (1744–1818), and created both the college and the Queen's College Grammar School, intended to be a preparatory school affiliated and governed by the college. The Grammar School, today the private Rutgers Preparatory School, was a part of the college community until 1959. New Brunswick was chosen as the location over Hackensack because the New Brunswick Dutch had the support of the Anglican population, making the royal charter easier to obtain.

The original purpose of Queen's College was to "educate the youth in language, liberal, the divinity, and useful arts and sciences" and for the training of future ministers for the Dutch Reformed Church. The college admitted its first students in 1771—a single sophomore and a handful of first-year students taught by a lone instructor—and granted its first degree in 1774, to Matthew Leydt. Despite the religious nature of the early college, the first classes were held at a tavern called the Sign of the Red Lion. When the Revolutionary War broke out and taverns were suspected by the British as being hotbeds of rebel activity, the college abandoned the tavern and held classes in private homes.

Like many colleges founded in the U.S. during this time, Rutgers benefited from slave labor and funds derived from purchasing and selling slaves. Research undertaken at the university in the 2010s began to prominently uncover and document these connections, including the university's foundation on land taken from the indigenous Lenape people.

Financial troubles and a benefactor

In its early years, due to a lack of funds, Queen's College was closed for two extended periods. Early trustees considered merging the college with the College of New Jersey, in Princeton (the measure failed by one vote) and later considered relocating to New York City. In 1808, after raising $12,000, the college temporarily reopened and broke ground on a building of its own, called "Old Queens," designed by architect John McComb, Jr. The college's third president, the Rev. Ira Condict, laid the cornerstone on April 27, 1809. Shortly after, the New Brunswick Theological Seminary, founded in 1784, relocated from Brooklyn, New York, to New Brunswick, and shared facilities with Queen's College (and the Queen's College Grammar School, as all three institutions were then overseen by the Reformed Church in America). During those formative years, all three institutions fit into Old Queens. In 1830, the Queen's College Grammar School moved across the street, and in 1856, the seminary relocated to a seven-acre (28,000 m2) tract less than one-half mile (800 m) away.

After several years of closure resulting from an economic depression after the War of 1812, Queen's College reopened in 1825 and was renamed "Rutgers College" in honor of American Revolutionary War hero Colonel Henry Rutgers (1745–1830). According to the board of trustees, Colonel Rutgers was honored because he epitomized Christian values. A year after the school was renamed, it received two donations from its namesake: a $200 bell still hanging from the cupola of Old Queen's and a $5,000 bond which placed the college on sound financial footing.

Land-grant college

Rutgers College became the land-grant college of New Jersey in 1864 under the Morrill Act of 1862, resulting in the establishment of the Rutgers Scientific School, featuring departments of agriculture, engineering, and chemistry. The Rutgers Scientific School would expand over the years to grow into the New Jersey Agricultural Experiment Station (1880) and divide into the College of Engineering (1914) and the College of Agriculture (1921). Rutgers created the New Jersey College for Women in 1918, and the School of Education in 1924. With the development of graduate education, and the continued expansion of the institution, the collection of schools became Rutgers University in 1924. Rutgers College continued as a liberal arts college within the university. Later, University College (1945) was founded to serve part-time, commuting students and Livingston College (1969) was created by the Rutgers Trustees, ensuring that the interests of ethnically diverse New Jersey students were met.

State university

Rutgers was designated the state university of New Jersey by acts of the New Jersey Legislature in 1945 and 1956.  Although Rutgers thus became a public university, it still retains—as the successor to the private college founded and chartered in 1766—some important private rights and protections from unilateral state efforts to change its fundamental character and mission.

The newly-designated state university absorbed the University of Newark (1935) in 1946 and then the College of South Jersey and South Jersey Law School, in 1950. These two institutions became Rutgers University–Newark and Rutgers University–Camden, respectively. On September 10, 1970, after much debate, the board of governors voted to admit women into Rutgers College.

There were setbacks in the growth of the university. In 1967, the Rutgers Physics Department had a Centers of Excellence Grant from the NSF which allowed the physics department to hire several faculty each year. These faculty were to be paid by the grant for three years, but after that time any faculty hired with the associate or full professor designation would become tenured. The governor and the chancellor forced Rutgers to lose this grant by rejecting the condition that tenure be granted.

In 1970, the newly formed Rutgers Medical School hired major faculty members from other institutions. In 1971, the governor's office separated Rutgers Medical School from Rutgers University and made it part of New Jersey College of Medicine and Dentistry, and many faculty left the medical school, including the dean of the medical school, Dr. Dewitt Stetten, who later became the director of the National Institutes of Health. As a result of the separation of the medical school from Rutgers University, graduate PhD programs that had been started in the medical center were lost, and students had to seek other institutions to finish their degrees. After the dissolution of the University of Medicine and Dentistry in 2013, the medical school again became part of the university.

1982–present

Prior to 1982, separate liberal arts faculties existed in the several separate "residential colleges" (Rutgers, Douglass, Livingston, University, and Cook colleges) at Rutgers–New Brunswick.

In 1982, under president Edward J. Bloustein, the liberal arts faculties of these five institutions were centralized into one college, the Faculty of Arts and Sciences, which itself had no students. The separate residential colleges persisted for students, and while instructors for classes were now drawn from the Faculty of Arts and Sciences, separate standards for admission, good standing, and graduation still continued for students, depending on which residential college they were enrolled in.

In 2007, Rutgers New Brunswick, Douglass, Livingston, and University Colleges, along with the Faculty of Arts and Sciences were merged into the new "School of Arts and Sciences" with one set of admissions criteria, curriculum, and graduation requirements. At this time, the liberal arts components of Cook College were absorbed into the School of Arts and Sciences as well, while the other aspects of that college remained, but as the School of Environmental and Biological Sciences. These changes in 2007 ended the 241-year history of Rutgers College as a distinct institution.

Students at the 2011 Rutgers tuition protests fought against rising education costs and diminished state subsidies. Campus groups (including the Rutgers Student Union, the Rutgers One Coalition and the Rutgers University Student Assembly (RUSA), supported by New Jersey United Students (NJUS), mobilized to keep the increase in annual student financial obligation to a minimum through marches, sit-ins, letters to administration officials and forums.

In 2011, there was an attempt by then New Jersey Governor Chris Christie and members of the legislature to merge Rutgers–Camden into Rowan University, it ultimately was rejected in part due to several on campus protests and pushback from Camden faculty, students, and alumni.

In 2013, most of the University of Medicine and Dentistry of New Jersey was integrated with Rutgers University and, along with several existing Rutgers units, was reformed as Rutgers Biomedical and Health Sciences. This merger attached the New Jersey Medical School and Robert Wood Johnson Medical School to Rutgers University.

On June 20, 2012, the outgoing president of Rutgers University, Richard L. McCormick, announced that Rutgers will "integrate five acres along George Street between Seminary Place and Bishop Place into the College Avenue Campus." Most of the block had been occupied by the New Brunswick Theological Seminary. Rutgers agreed to rebuild the seminary in exchange for the land it gave up.

In 2013, Rutgers changed part of its alma mater, "On the Banks of the Old Raritan." Where the lyrics had stated, "My father sent me to old Rutgers, and resolved that I should be a man," now they state, "From far and near we came to Rutgers, and resolved to learn all that we can." The alma mater for the Camden campus "On the Banks of the Old Delaware" are lyrically similar aside from the river name.

Rutgers celebrated its 250th anniversary in 2016. On May 15, President Barack Obama became the first sitting president to speak at the university's commencement. The university held a variety of celebrations, academic programs, and commemorative events which culminated on the 250th anniversary date, November 10, 2016. Rutgers invited multiple notable alumni from around the world to the celebration. Steven Van Zandt was the commencement speaker the following year and received an honorary doctorate.

In November 2016, Rutgers released research findings that revealed "an untold history of some of the institution's founders as slave owners and the displacement of the Native Americans who once occupied land that was later transferred to the college."

In January 2020, Jonathan Holloway made history as the first African American and person of color to be named president of Rutgers.

Organization and administration

University president

Since 1785, twenty-one men have served as the institution's president, beginning with the Reverend Jacob Rutsen Hardenbergh, a Dutch Reformed minister who was responsible for establishing the college. Before 1930, most of the university's presidents were clergy affiliated with Christian denominations in the Reformed tradition (either Dutch or German Reformed, or Presbyterian). Two presidents were alumni of Rutgers College—the Rev. William H. S. Demarest (Class of 1883) and Philip Milledoler Brett (Class of 1892).

The president serves in an ex officio capacity as a presiding officer within the university's 59-member board of trustees and its eleven-member board of governors, and is appointed by these boards to oversee day-to-day operations of the university across its campuses. He is charged with implementing "board policies with the help and advice of senior administrators and other members of the university community." The president is responsible only to those two governing boards—there is no oversight by state officials. Frequently, the president also occupies a professorship in his academic discipline and engages in instructing students.

The current president is Dr. Jonathan Holloway who assumed the role on July 1, 2020.

Governing boards
Governance at Rutgers University rests with a board of trustees consisting of 41 members, and a board of governors consisting of 15 voting members: 8 appointed by the Governor of New Jersey and 7 chosen by and from among the board of trustees. The trustees constitute chiefly an advisory body to the board of governors and are the fiduciary overseers of the property and assets of the university that existed before the institution became the State University of New Jersey in 1945. The initial reluctance of the trustees (still acting as a private corporate body) to cede control of certain business affairs to the state government for direction and oversight caused the state to establish the board of governors in 1956.<ref>"A View from the Inside"   (an interview with Dr. Richard P. McCormick) by Thomas J. Frusciano in Rutgers Magazine" (Winter 2006). Retrieved August 16, 2006.</ref> Today, the board of governors maintains much of the corporate control of the university.

The members of the board of trustees are voted upon by different constituencies or appointed. "Two faculty and two students are elected by the University Senate as nonvoting representatives. The 59 voting members are chosen in the following way as mandated by state law: 20 charter members (of whom at least three shall be women), 16 alumni members nominated by the nominating committee of the board of trustees, and five public members appointed by the governor of the state with confirmation by the New Jersey State Senate.

Affiliations

 Association of American Universities
 Middle States Association of Colleges and Schools
 Big Ten Academic Alliance
 Universities Research Association
 Association of Public and Land-grant Universities
 Big Ten Conference

Locations and divisions

Rutgers University has three campuses in New Jersey. The New Brunswick Campus, located in New Brunswick and adjacent Piscataway, is the largest campus of the university. The Newark Campus in Newark and the Camden Campus in Camden are located in the northern and southern parts of the state, respectively. Combined, these campuses comprise 33 degree-granting schools and colleges, offering undergraduate, graduate and professional levels of study. The university is centrally administered from New Brunswick, although chancellors at the Newark and Camden campuses hold significant autonomy for some academic issues.

Rutgers–New Brunswick

The New Brunswick Campus (or Rutgers–New Brunswick) is the largest campus and the site of the original Rutgers College. Spread across six municipalities in Middlesex County, New Jersey, it lies chiefly in the City of New Brunswick and adjacent Piscataway, and is composed of five smaller campuses and a few buildings in downtown New Brunswick. The historic College Avenue Campus is close to downtown New Brunswick and includes the seat of the university, Old Queens and other nineteenth-century and early twentieth-century buildings that constitute the Queens Campus and Voorhees Mall. Its proximity to New Brunswick's train station and numerous food vendors located downtown, in addition to a large amount of off-campus housing and fraternity and sorority houses make this a popular weekend destination. Across the city, Douglass Campus and Cook Campus are intertwined with each other and are often referred to collectively as the Cook/Douglass Campus. Cook Campus has extensive farms and woods that reach into North Brunswick and East Brunswick. Separated by the Raritan River are Busch Campus, in Piscataway, and Livingston Campus, also mainly in Piscataway but including remote sections of land extending into Edison and Highland Park. The Busch Campus is noted as the home of Rutgers' highly ranked Ernest Mario School of Pharmacy, as well as the golf course and football stadium. The Livingston campus is home to Jersey Mike's Arena (formerly the Rutgers Athletic Center [RAC]), a trapezoidal building which is home for many sports teams, notably the men's basketball team. Additionally, this campus has undergone many renovations and is regarded as the most "modern" campus. The campus entrance is delineated by the all-glass Rutgers Business School building known as "100 Rock" (because of the building's Piscataway address, 100 Rockafeller Road). From this building's fifth floor lounge, one can see the distant skyline of New York City on many clear days. Featuring (arguably) the best dining hall and top notch housing, Livingston attracts many students who may want a quieter city-life experience than the one on College Avenue. Rutgers Campus Buses transport students between the various campuses.

As of 2010, the New Brunswick-Piscataway campuses include 19 undergraduate, graduate and professional schools, including the School of Arts and Sciences, the School of Communication and Information, the Edward J. Bloustein School of Planning and Public Policy, the School of Engineering, the School of Environmental and Biological Sciences, the Ernest Mario School of Pharmacy, the Graduate School, the Graduate School of Applied and Professional Psychology, the Graduate School of Education, the School of Management and Labor Relations, Mason Gross School of the Arts, the College of Nursing, the Rutgers Business School and the School of Social Work. , 40,434 students (31,593 undergraduates and 8,841 graduate students) were enrolled at the New Brunswick-Piscataway campus. The New Brunswick-Piscataway campus includes a Business School building on the Livingston Campus.

Rutgers–Newark

The Newark Campus (or Rutgers–Newark) consists of eight undergraduate, graduate and professional schools, including: Newark College of Arts and Sciences, University College, School of Criminal Justice, Graduate School, School of Nursing, School of Public Affairs and Administration, Rutgers Business School and the Newark location of the Rutgers Law School. , 7,666 undergraduates and 4,345 graduate students (total 12,011) are enrolled at the Newark campus. Originally the University of Newark, the campus became Rutgers–Newark in 1945.

Rutgers–Camden

The Camden Campus (or Rutgers–Camden) consists of six undergraduate, graduate and professional schools, including: Camden College of Arts and Sciences, University College, Graduate School, Rutgers School of Business–Camden, Rutgers School of Nursing–Camden, and the Camden location of the Rutgers Law School. The schools are located in the Cooper's Grant and Central Waterfront neighborhoods of Camden. , 4,708 undergraduates and 1,635 graduate students (total 6,343) are enrolled at the Camden campus. The campus was founded as the College of South Jersey and South Jersey Law School in the 1920s, and became part of Rutgers in 1950.

Rutgers Biomedical and Health Sciences

The Rutgers Biomedical and Health Sciences (RBHS) is a division of the university that serves as an umbrella organization for schools, centers, and institutes from Rutgers University and the old University of Medicine and Dentistry of New Jersey. The organization was incorporated into the university following the 2013 merger of Rutgers and the UMDNJ. While its various facilities are spread across several locations statewide, Rutgers Biomedical and Health Sciences is considered a "campus" for certain organizational purposes, such as the appointment of a separate chancellor.Nurin, Tara. "Outspoken Rutgers Faculty Objects to School's New Strategic Plan" , NJSpotlight, February 18, 2014. Quote: "...with Rutgers’ legislatively mandated takeover of the University of Medicine and Dentistry of New Jersey (UMDNJ), the creation of a fourth (theoretical) RBHS campus". Retrieved March 14, 2014.University of Medicine and Dentistry of New Jersey; State of New Jersey, Commission on Higher Education. UMDNJ Final Annual Institutional Profile, June 30, 2013  (2013), 187. Quote: "The legacy UMDNJ Schools as well as biomedical schools/units from Rutgers University were designated a fourth "campus" of Rutgers University, the Rutgers Biomedical and Health Sciences (RBHS) campus." Retrieved March 15, 2014.

RBHS comprises nine schools and other research centers and institutes including; Ernest Mario School of Pharmacy, Graduate School of Biomedical Sciences, New Jersey Medical School, Robert Wood Johnson Medical School, School of Nursing, School of Dental Medicine, School of Health Related Professions, the School of Public Health, Cancer Institute of New Jersey, Center for Advanced Biotechnology and Medicine, Environmental and the Occupational Health Sciences Institute, Brain Health Institute, and the Institute for Health, Health Care Policy and Aging Research. The programs are offered at different location sites across New Jersey in New Brunswick, Newark, Blackwood, Stratford and Scotch Plains.

Rutgers-Online

As of 2015, Rutgers offered a total of 11 fully online degree programs at the undergraduate and graduate levels. Online degree programs at Rutgers must meet the same academic expectations, in terms of both teaching and learning outcomes, as traditional on-campus programs. During the COVID-19 pandemic, a majority of courses were conducted through remote instruction.

Off-campus

Rutgers offers classes at several off-campus sites in affiliation with community colleges and other state colleges throughout New Jersey. These partnerships are designed to enable students to achieve a seamless transfer to Rutgers, and to take all of their Rutgers classes in a select number of the most popular majors at the community college campus. The collaborative effort provides access to Rutgers faculty teaching Rutgers courses, at a convenient location, but it is also one of the few programs that cater exclusively to the non-traditional student population. Rutgers' current partners include Atlantic Cape, Brookdale, Mercer, Morris, Camden, and Raritan Valley community colleges.

Academics

The university offers more than 100 distinct bachelor, 100 master, and 80 doctoral and professional degree programs across 175 academic departments, 29 degree-granting schools and colleges, 16 of which offer graduate programs of study.

It is accredited by the Commission on Higher Education of the Middle States Association of Colleges and Schools (1921), and in 1989, became a member of the Association of American Universities, an organization of the 62 leading research universities in North America. Rutgers–New Brunswick is classified among "R1: Doctoral Universities – Very high research activity". Rutgers–Newark and Rutgers–Camden are classified by the same organization as "R2: Doctoral Universities – High research activity".

Admissions

 Undergraduate U.S. News & World Report considers the New Brunswick campus of Rutgers University to be a "more selective" school in terms of the rigor of its admissions processes. For the Class of 2025 (enrolling fall 2021), the New Brunswick campus received 43,161 applications and accepted 29,419 (68.2%). The number enrolling was 7,105; the yield rate (the percentage of accepted students who enroll) was 24.2%. The freshman retention rate is 94%, with 83.8% going on to graduate within six years. 

Of the 45% of the incoming freshman class who submitted SAT scores; the middle 50 percent Composite scores were 1240-1470. Of the 7% of enrolled freshmen in 2021 who submitted ACT scores; the middle 50 percent Composite score was between 27 and 33. 

Rutgers, the State University of New Jersey is a college-sponsor of the National Merit Scholarship Program and sponsored 21 Merit Scholarship awards in 2020. In the 2020–2021 academic year, 29 freshman students were National Merit Scholars.

Financial aid

As a state university, Rutgers charges two separate rates for tuition and fees depending on an enrolled student's residency. The Office of Institutional Research and Academic Planning estimates that costs in-state student of attending Rutgers would amount to $25,566 for an undergraduate living on-campus and $30,069 for a graduate student. For an out-of-state student, the costs rise to $38,228 and $39,069 respectively. As of the 2012–2013 academic school year, the cost of attendance for in-state students is $13,073, $26,393 for out-of-state students and $11,412 for Room and Board.

In the 2010–2011 academic year, undergraduate students at Rutgers, through a combination of federal (53.5%), state (23.6%), university (18.1%), and private (4.8%) scholarship, loans, and grants, received $492,260,845 of financial aid. 81.4% of all undergraduates, or 34,473 students, received some form of financial aid. During the same period, graduate students, through a combination of federal (61.9%), state (1.8%), university (34.5%), and private (1.9%) scholarship, loans, and grants received $182,384,256 of financial aid. 81.5% of all graduate students, or 11,852 students received some form of financial aid.

In 2007, the university's office for Enrollment Management launched the Rutgers Future Scholars Program as an initiative to help 7th graders from low-income families achieve academic success and be the first in their families to go to college. The program targets students from the school systems of Rutgers's hometowns, New Brunswick/Piscataway, Newark, and Camden. Once admitted, the students receive mentoring and college prep courses each summer leading up to the year of their college applications. If admitted to the university, they are given a full tuition scholarship for four years of undergraduate study. The program has been very successful and currently admits as many as 200 new 7th graders each year with the most of the original 200 now attending the university as undergraduates.

Rankings

In the 2022 U.S. News & World Report rankings of universities in the United States, the New Brunswick campus of Rutgers is tied for 55rd among national universities overall and ranked tied for 23rd among public universities. U.S. News & World Report ranked the Camden campus 127th among national universities, and 18th in top performers for social mobility. The same ranking placed Rutgers-New Brunswick in the top 25 among all U.S. universities for the following graduate school programs: Library Science (7th), English (15th), Fine Arts (23rd), History (21st) (with the subspecialties of Women's History and African-American History both ranked 1st), Social Work (17th), and Mathematics (22nd). U.S. News ranked Rutgers-Camden 58th for graduate nursing programs, and 83rd among graduate public policy programs. Rutgers University-New Brunswick has consistently ranked 2nd for Philosophy according the QS World University Rankings and the Philosophy Gourmet Report. QS also ranks Rutgers as number 42, nationally. The Center for World University Rankings (CWUR) has Rutgers-New Brunswick ranked 29th nationally and 50th globally in 2020–2021.
QS Top Universities ranked Rutgers-New Brunswick 264 in the world in 2022. U.S. News & World Report ranking placed Rutgers #130 in Best Global Universities with #47
in Agricultural Sciences, #45 in Arts and Humanities (tie), #61 in Mathematics, #66 in Cell Biology, #63 in Economics and Business, #99 in Computer Science, #37 in Pharmacology and Toxicology, and #23 in Food Science and Technology. The RBS Master of Quantitative Finance (M.Q.F.) program, and the Master of Mathematical Finance (M.S.M.F) program in the department of mathematics, are ranked 7th in the United States.

Under the New Jersey Medical and Health Sciences Education Restructuring Act of 2012, the University of Medicine and Dentistry of New Jersey was dissolved. Most of its schools, including Robert Wood Johnson Medical School, New Jersey Medical School, and New Jersey Dental School, were merged into the new Rutgers Biomedical and Health Sciences, formed in 2013.

 Study abroad 
Rutgers study abroad program has been offering opportunities for international study for over 50 years. Rutgers global offers more than 180 study and service-learning programs to more than 50 countries for all majors. These programs range from short term summer programs to long term semester programs. Often scholarships and financial support is offered to students who wish to study abroad. Rutgers also hosts students from universities around the globe.

Libraries

The Rutgers University Libraries (RUL) system consists of twenty-six libraries, centers and reading rooms located on the university's four campuses. Housing a collection that includes 4,383,848 volumes (print and electronic), 4,605,896 microforms, as well as a wide array of electronic indexes and abstracts, full-text electronic journals, and research guides, Rutgers University Libraries ranks among the nation's top research libraries. The American Library Association ranks the Rutgers University Library system as the 44th largest library in the United States in terms of volumes held.

The Archibald S. Alexander Library in New Brunswick, known to many students as "Club Alex", is the oldest and the largest library of the university, and houses an extensive humanities and social science collection.Archibald S. Alexander Library Collection Description  Accessed January 10, 2007 It also supports the work of faculty and staff at four professional schools: the Edward J. Bloustein School of Planning and Public Policy, the Graduate School of Education, the Graduate School of Social Work, and the School of Communication and Information. Alexander Library is also a Federal Depository Library, maintaining a large collection of government documents, which contains United States, New Jersey, foreign, and international government publications. The Paul Robeson Library in Camden, serves Rutgers affiliates as well as the Camden campuses of Rowan University and Camden County College with a broad collection of volumes, and also houses an archive including the papers of poet Nick Virgilio. The Dana Library is the main research library for the Newark campus, and is also home to the Institute of Jazz Studies, one of the world's largest collections of jazz archives and research. The Library of Science and Medicine (LSM) on the Busch Campus in Piscataway houses the university's collection in behavioral, biological, earth, and pharmaceutical sciences and engineering. LSM also serves as a designated depository library for government publication regarding science, and owns a U.S. patent collection and patent search facility. It was officially established as the Library of Science and Medicine in July 1964 although the beginning of the development of a library for science started in 1962. The current character of LSM is a university science library also serving a medical school. On the New Brunswick-Piscataway campus, in addition to Alexander Library, many individual disciplines have their own libraries, including Alcohol Studies, Art History, Chemistry, Mathematics, Music, and Physics. Special Collections and University Archives houses the Sinclair New Jersey Collection, manuscript collection, and rare book collection, as well as the university archives. Although located in the Alexander Library building, Special Collections and University Archives actually comprises a distinct unit unto itself. Also located within the Alexander Library is the East Asian Library which holds a sizable collection of Chinese, Japanese and Korean monographs and periodicals. There are nine major libraries at the Rutgers- New Brunswick location which are the Alexander Library, Art Library, Carr Library, Chang Library, Douglass Library, Library of Science and Medicine, Math and Physics Library, School of Management and Labor Relations Library, and Special Collections & University Archives Library. Both the Newark and Camden campuses have law libraries. Individual items and collections within the Libraries can be identified using the Integrated Rutgers Information System.

Museums and collections

Rutgers oversees several museums and collections that are open to the public.
 Jane Voorhees Zimmerli Art Museum, on the College Avenue Campus maintains a collection of over 60,000 works of art, focusing on Russian and Soviet art, French 19th-century art and American 19th- and 20th-century art with a concentration on early-20th-century and contemporary prints.
 Rutgers University Geology Museum in Geology Hall features exhibits on geology and anthropology, with an emphasis on the natural history of New Jersey. The largest exhibits include a dinosaur trackway from Towaco, New Jersey; a mastodon from Salem County; and a Ptolemaic era Egyptian mummy.
 Rutgers Gardens, which features  of horticultural, display, and botanical gardens, as well as arboretums.
 Stedman Art Gallery on the Camden campus is a collection of local, national, and international artwork and exhibits as part of the Rutgers Camden Center for the Arts.
 Edison Papers is a collection of roughly 5 million documents related to Thomas Alva Edison. Nearly 175,000 of these documents are digitized and available to be viewed through their website.

Rutgers' facilities across the four campuses include a golf course, botanical gardens, working agricultural, horse, dairy, and sustainable farms, a creamery, an ecological preserve with multiple use trails, television and radio studios, theaters, museums, athletic facilities, helipads, a makerspace, and more. The New Jersey Museum of Agriculture closed in 2011.

Research

Rutgers is home to the Rutgers University Center for Cognitive Science, also known as RUCCS. This research center hosts researchers in psychology, linguistics, computer science, philosophy, electrical engineering, and anthropology.

It was at Rutgers that Selman Waksman (1888–1973) discovered several antibiotics, including actinomycin, clavacin, streptothricin, grisein, neomycin, fradicin, candicidin, candidin, and others. Waksman, along with graduate student Albert Schatz (1920–2005), discovered streptomycin—a versatile antibiotic that was to be the first applied to cure tuberculosis. For this discovery, Waksman received the Nobel Prize for Medicine in 1952.

Rutgers developed water-soluble sustained release polymers, tetraploids, robotic hands, artificial bovine insemination, and the ceramic tiles for the heat shield on the Space Shuttle. In health related field, Rutgers has the Environmental & Occupational Health Science Institute (EOHSI).

Rutgers is also home to the RCSB Protein Data bank, 'an information portal to Biological Macromolecular Structures' cohosted with the San Diego Supercomputer Center. This database is the authoritative research tool for bioinformaticists using protein primary, secondary and tertiary structures worldwide.'

Rutgers is home to the Rutgers Cooperative Research & Extension office, which is run by the Agricultural and Experiment Station with the support of local government. The institution provides research & education to the local farming and agro industrial community in 19 of the 21 counties of the state and educational outreach programs offered through the New Jersey Agricultural Experiment Station Office of Continuing Professional Education.

Rutgers University Cell and DNA Repository (RUCDR) is the largest university based repository in the world and has received awards worth more than $57.8 million from the National Institutes of Health (NIH). One will fund genetic studies of mental disorders and the other will support investigations into the causes of digestive, liver and kidney diseases, and diabetes. RUCDR activities will enable gene discovery leading to diagnoses, treatments and, eventually, cures for these diseases. RUCDR assists researchers throughout the world by providing the highest quality biomaterials, technical consultation, and logistical support.

Rutgers–Camden is home to the nation's PhD granting Department of Childhood Studies. This department, in conjunction with the Center for Children and Childhood Studies, also on the Camden campus, conducts interdisciplinary research which combines methodologies and research practices of sociology, psychology, literature, anthropology and other disciplines into the study of childhoods internationally.

Rutgers is home to several National Science Foundation IGERT fellowships that support interdisciplinary scientific research at the graduate-level. Highly selective fellowships are available in the following areas: Perceptual Science, Stem Cell Science and Engineering, Nanotechnology for Clean Energy, Renewable and Sustainable Fuels Solutions, and Nanopharmaceutical Engineering.

Rutgers also maintains the Office of Research Alliances that focuses on working with companies to increase engagement with the university's faculty members, staff and extensive resources on the four campuses.

Student life

Residential life

Rutgers University offers a variety of housing options. On the New Brunswick-Piscataway campus, students are given the option of on-campus housing in both traditional dorms or apartments. Freshman students, however, are allowed only a dorm, while upperclassmen have a wider array of on-campus housing choices, like apartments, but must apply for on-campus housing through the Rutgers online lottery process. Most students seeking on-campus housing will be accommodated with a space and sophomores are guaranteed housing. Many Rutgers students opt to rent apartments or houses off-campus within the city of New Brunswick. Similar setups are to be found in Rutgers–Newark and Rutgers–Camden.

Rutgers University's four campuses are in the culturally-diverse, redeveloping urban areas (Newark, Camden, and New Brunswick) with convenient access to New York City and Philadelphia by Amtrak, New Jersey Transit, as well as regional lines such as PATCO, or by automobile. U.S. News & World Report ranked Rutgers–Newark the most diverse university campus in the United States. Because the area of Rutgers' New Brunswick-Piscataway campus—which is composed of several constituent colleges and professional schools—is sprawled across six municipalities, the individual campuses are connected by an inter-campus bus system. The Rutgers bus system is the second largest bus service in New Jersey, and one of the largest in the country.

Security and emergency services

Services provided by the university include Rutgers Police, Emergency Medical Services, an emergency management office, bus and shuttle service, inter- and intra-campus mail, and occupational and environmental health and safety.

Student organizations and activities

Rutgers University has a student government which controls funding to student groups. The student government is made up of campus councils and professional school councils. Those councils then send representatives to the student assembly as well as the university senate. An example of these campus councils is the University College Council, which represents adult, part-time, and military veteran students.

Rutgers hosts over 700 student organizations; among the first student groups was the first college newspaper in the United States. The Political Intelligencer and New Jersey Adviser began publication at Queen's College in 1783, and ceased operation in 1785. Continuing this tradition is the university's current college newspaper, The Daily Targum, established in 1869, which is the second-oldest college newspaper published in the United States, after The Dartmouth (1843). Both poet Joyce Kilmer and economist Milton Friedman served as editors. Also included are The Medium, a weekly satirical newspaper billed as Rutgers Entertainment Weekly, Rutgers Centurion, a conservative newspaper, the Rutgers University Glee Club, a male choral singing group established in 1872 (among the oldest in the country). Rutgers a cappella groups have routinely placed well in the International Championship of Collegiate A Cappella, including 2010 when The OrphanSporks placed second in the semifinals. Governed by the Rutgers University Student Assembly and funded by student fees, students can organize groups for practically any political ideology or issue, ethnic or religious affiliation, academic subject, activity, or hobby.

Rutgers University is home to chapters of many Greek organizations, and a significant percentage of the undergraduate student body is active in Greek life. Several fraternities and sororities maintain houses for their chapters in the area of Union Street (known familiarly as "Frat Row") in New Brunswick, within blocks of Rutgers' College Avenue Campus. Chapters of Zeta Psi and Delta Phi organized at Rutgers as early as 1845. The Alpha Rho chapter of Chi Psi fraternity, founded at Rutgers College in 1879, was the first fraternity at Rutgers to own a fraternity house, or "Lodge," purchased in 1887. The fraternity today still owns and occupies the same property at 114 College Avenue. Today, there are over 50 fraternities and sororities on the New Brunswick-Piscataway campus, ranging from traditional to historically African-American, Hispanic, Multicultural, and Asian interest organizations. The New Brunswick campus of Rutgers University has a chapter of the only active co-ed pre-medical fraternity, Phi Delta Epsilon, . Greek organizations are governed by the Office of Fraternity and Sorority Affairs. Twelve organizations maintain chapters in New Brunswick without sanction by the university's administration. Students involved in Greek Life must meet academic eligibility requirements including maintaining a cumulative 2.5 GPA, completion of 12 credits, and be a currently enrolled full-time student. Some individual organizations hold a higher GPA requirement.

Many Greek organizations hold fundraising events specific to their philanthropy. However, it's Rutgers tradition that our students participate in one of the largest student-run philanthropic events in New Jersey. All proceeds go to the non-profit organization, Embrace Kids Foundation. This foundation advocates for children with cancer and blood disorders. Dance Marathon includes over 400 dancers pledging to stay away and stand for 32 hours with the support and help of 500 volunteers. Dance Marathon 2015 collected a record-breaking $692,046.67.

In the late 19th century, the university banned fraternities because of their unusual hazing practices. This caused them to go underground as secret societies. It also sparked the interest of some students to create their own societies. Cap and Skull was founded at Rutgers before the turn of the 20th century.

Rutgers has five vocal ensembles: Voorhees Choir (the New Brunswick campus's women's ensemble), Kirkpatrick Choir (the university's most selective coed ensemble), Glee Club (New Brunswick's most esteemed male ensemble), University Choir (a larger mixed choir in New Brunswick), and the Rutgers Concert Choir (Camden's vocal ensemble of faculty and students).

In 2016, the Iota Psi chapter of Sigma Chi raised a national Greek record of $300,007 for the Children's Miracle Network with the help of seven sororities: Alpha Gamma Delta, Delta Gamma, Gamma Phi Beta, Phi Sigma Sigma, Sigma Delta Tau, Sigma Kappa, and Zeta Tau Alpha.

Traditions

The Grease Trucks are a group of truck-based food vendors located at various locations on the New Brunswick campus. They serve traditional grill fare, Middle-Eastern specialties, and are especially well known for serving "Fat Sandwiches," a sub roll containing various ingredients such as cheesesteak, burgers, pork roll, chicken fingers, French fries, mozzarella sticks, eggs, bacon, gyro meat, and marinara sauce. The Rutgers Grease Trucks were located in a designated lot for nearly two decades until August 2013. Truck owners were forced to relocate due to the construction of an $84-million student apartment complex. Three trucks remain on the College Avenue Campus, while the remaining two were moved to the Cook/Douglass Campus.

The Dance Marathon is a student-run organization that consists of a year-long series of fundraisers and culminates with the annual Marathon on April 5–6 in the College Avenue Gym. At the Marathon over 400 dancers pledge to raise funds and remain standing for 32 hours without sleeping. The 'Dancers', along with over 500 volunteers and countless visitors, are entertained by live bands, comedians, prize giveaways, games, sports, a mechanical bull, computer and internet access, various theme hours and much more. Rutgers has held this tradition since 1999 and to date has raised in excess of $1.3 million for the Embrace Kids Foundation. In the seventies the Dance Marathon raised funds for the American Cancer Society. In the Eighties it was the Rutger Cancer Research Association.

'RutgersFest was a day-long cultural event staged variously on either Livingston Campus or Busch Campus. It was designed to promote college spirit through student organization participation with activities and entertainment throughout the day, culminating with a free concert and fireworks at night. The event was free to all students and guests and was funded as part of an elected programming fee paid by all students as part of tuition. Past musical guests have included Kanye West, Everclear, Sugar Ray, Guster, Goldfinger, Ludacris, Reel Big Fish, Method Man and Redman, Fuel, Third Eye Blind, Hawthorne Heights, NAS, SR-71, Ok Go, N.E.R.D and Pitbull. The event would feature carnival attractions such as bungee bull, bouncy boxing, moon walk, electronic basketball, a recording studio and more. Attendance for the annual event was about 40,000–50,000, topping out at an estimated 65,000 in 2004 at the event which featured Kanye West and Sugar Ray The event was staged by the Rutgers University Programming Association (RUPA), which used to be known as the Rutgers College Programming Committee (RCPC), as a year-end celebration before the start of the final examination period.

During its final year in 2011, the festival was held on Busch Campus. Invited musical guests included Yelawolf, Pitbull, and 3OH!3. Several violent incidents that year lead to the indefinite cancellation of the event. President Richard McCormick, in a letter to the Rutgers community, commented: "The problems that occur following RutgersFest have grown beyond our capacity to manage them, and the only responsible course of action is to cancel the event."

Rutgers Day is a campus and community celebration held annually on the Camden, New Brunswick, and Newark campuses.

Many student houses also have mountains of trash, mimicking landfills. This is a tradition started by the Delafield House.

Mottos, colors and mascots
Rutgers University's motto Sol iustitiae et occidentem illustra is a modification of Utrecht University's motto Sol iustitiae illustra nos gleaned from a literal Latin Bible translation of Malachi 4:2 and highlights the historic connection of these two universities.

Rutgers University's only school color is scarlet. Students had sought to make orange the school color, citing Rutgers' Dutch heritage and in reference to the Prince of Orange. The Rutgers student publication Targum (which would become the Daily Targum) proposed that scarlet be adopted in May 1869, claiming that it was a striking color and because scarlet ribbon was easily obtained. During the first intercollegiate football game with Princeton on November 6, 1869, the players from Rutgers wore scarlet-colored turbans and handkerchiefs to distinguish them as a team from the Princeton players. The board of trustees officially made scarlet the school color in 1900.

In its early days, Rutgers athletes were known informally as "The Scarlet" in reference to the school color, or as "Queensmen" in reference to the institution's first name, Queen's College. In 1925, the mascot was changed to Chanticleer, a fighting rooster from the medieval fable Reynard the Fox (Le Roman de Renart) which was used by Geoffrey Chaucer in the Canterbury Tales. At the time, the student humour magazine at Rutgers was called Chanticleer, and one of its early arts editors, Ozzie Nelson (later of The Adventures of Ozzie and Harriet fame) was quarterback of the Rutgers team from 1924 to 1926. The Chanticleer mascot was unveiled at a football game against Lafayette College, in which Lafayette was also introducing a new mascot, a leopard. However, the choice of Chanticleer as a mascot was often the subject of ridicule because of its association with "being chicken." In 1955, the mascot was changed to the Scarlet Knight after a campus-wide election, beating out other contenders such as "Queensmen," the "Scarlet," the "Red Lions," the "Redmen" and the "Flying Dutchmen."Series of articles in the spring of 1955 issues of the Rutgers Targum (then printed weekly), the Rutgers University campus newspaper. Microfilm records v.94:no.36-v.104:no.58 Apr 17,1953 – Dec 5, 1972, Archibald S. Alexander Library, Current Periodicals and Microforms Department, Rutgers University, New Brunswick, New Jersey Earlier proposed nicknames included "Pioneers" and "Cannoneers." When Harvey Harman, then coach of the football team, was asked why he supported changing the Rutgers mascot, he was quoted as saying, "Awnish You can call it the Chanticleer, you can call it a fighting cock, you can call it any damn thing you want, but everybody knows it's a chicken." Harman later is said to have bought the first "Scarlet Knight" mascot costume for the 1955 season, which was to be his final season as football coach at Rutgers.

In later years the Camden and Newark campuses adopted their own mascots, the Scarlet Raptor (Camden) and the Scarlet Raider (Newark).

Athletics(Note: The Rutgers–Camden athletic teams are called the Scarlet Raptors. The Rutgers–Newark athletic teams are called the Scarlet Raiders. The Scarlet Raiders and the Scarlet Raptors both compete within NCAA Division III.)Rutgers was among the first American institutions to engage in intercollegiate athletics, and participated in a small circle of schools that included Yale University, Columbia University and long-time rival, Princeton University (then called the College of New Jersey). The four schools met at the Fifth Avenue Hotel in Manhattan on October 19, 1873, to establish a set of rules governing their intercollegiate competition, and particularly to codify the new game of football. Although invited, Harvard chose not to attend. In the early years of intercollegiate athletics, the schools that participated in these athletic events were located solely in the American Northeast. However, by the turn of the 20th century, colleges and universities across the United States began to participate.

Rutgers University is referred to as "the birthplace of college football" as the first intercollegiate football game was held on College Field between Rutgers and Princeton on November 6, 1869, in New Brunswick, New Jersey on a plot of ground behind where the present-day College Avenue Gymnasium now stands. Rutgers won the game, with a score of 6 runs to Princeton's 4. According to Parke H. Davis, the 1869 Rutgers football team shared the national title with Princeton. (This game is believed to have been closer to soccer than to modern American football.)

In 1864, rowing became the first organized sport at Rutgers. Six mile races were held on the Raritan River among six-oared boats. In 1870, Rutgers held its first intercollegiate competition, against the Lawrence Scientific School of Harvard, the then top-ranked amateur crew of the time. Since the start in 1864, Rutgers has built a strong crew program consisting of heavyweight and lightweight men. Women's crew was added to the program in 1974. Financial support of the men's crew program was discontinued by the university in 2006, though the crew continues to compete (funded entirely by alumni and private support) at a high level in the prestigious Eastern Association of Rowing Colleges conference.

The first intercollegiate athletic event at Rutgers was a baseball game on May 2, 1866, against Princeton in which they suffered a 40–2 loss.

Beginning in 1866, Rutgers was unaffiliated with any formal athletic conference and thus classified as "independent" for eighty years. From 1946 to 1951, the university was a member of the Middle Three Conference, and from 1958 to 1961, was a member of the Middle Atlantic Conference. In 1978, the Rutgers Scarlet Knights became a member of the Atlantic 10 conference. In 1991, it joined the Big East Conference for football. All sports programs at Rutgers New Brunswick subsequently became affiliated with the Big East in 1995.

The first intercollegiate competition in Ultimate Frisbee (now called "Ultimate") was held between students from Rutgers and Princeton on November 6, 1972, to mark the one hundred third anniversary of the first intercollegiate football game. Rutgers won 29–27. The Rutgers Scarlet Knights men's Basketball Team was among the "Final Four" and ended the 1976 season ranked fourth in the United States, after an 86–70 loss against the University of Michigan in the semifinals, and a 106–92 loss against UCLA in the consolation round of the 1976 NCAA Men's Division I Basketball Tournament.

The Rutgers Scarlet Knights are members of the Big Ten Conference, a collegiate athletic conference consisting of 14 colleges and universities from the Midwestern and East Coast regions of the United States. The Big Ten Conference is a member of the Bowl Championship Series. Rutgers currently fields 27 intercollegiate sports programs and is a Division I school as sanctioned by the National Collegiate Athletic Association. Rutgers fields thirty teams in NCAA Division I sanctioned sports, including football, baseball, basketball, crew, cross country, fencing, field hockey, golf, gymnastics, lacrosse, soccer, softball, tennis, track and field, swimming and diving, wrestling, and volleyball.

The Scarlet Knights have won five Big East Conference tournament titles: men's soccer (1997), men's track & field (2005), baseball (2000, 2007), and women's basketball (2007). Several other teams have won regular season titles but failed to win the conference's championship tournament.

Although the Rutgers Scarlet Knights' football team had losing seasons in 2016 and 2015 (won-lost records of 2–10 and 4–8, respectively) it achieved success previously, being invited to the Insight Bowl on December 27, 2005, in which they lost 45 to 40 against Arizona State University. This was Rutgers' first bowl appearance since the December 16, 1978, loss against Arizona State, 34–18, at the Garden State Bowl. The 2006 football season also saw Rutgers being ranked within the Top 25 teams in major college football polls. After the November 9, 2006 victory over the 3rd ranked, undefeated Louisville Cardinals, Rutgers jumped up to seventh in the AP Poll, eighth in the USA Today/Coaches poll, seventh in the Harris Interactive Poll, and sixth in the Bowl Championship Series rankings. These were Rutgers' highest rankings in the football polls since they were ranked fifteenth in 1961. Rutgers ended the season 11–2 after winning the inaugural Texas Bowl on December 28, 2006, defeating the Wildcats of Kansas State University by a score of 37–10 and finishing the season ranked twelfth in the final AP poll of sportswriters, the team's highest season-ending ranking.

Under Head Coach C. Vivian Stringer, the women's basketball program is among the elite programs in the country as they remain consistently ranked in the Top 25, consistently making the NCAA Women's Championship Tournament, and sometimes winning the Big East regular season championship. In 2006–2007, the Scarlet Knights won their first ever Big East Conference Tournament Championship. The program has been highly competitive since its inception, winning the 1982 AIAW National Championship, reaching the 2000 Final Four, and reaching the Final Four and national championship game in 2007.

The Scarlet Knights maintain athletic rivalries with other collegiate institutions. The university has historic rivalries with Princeton University, Columbia University (formerly King's College), Lafayette College, Lehigh University and New York University originating from the early days of college football. While they maintain this rivalry in other sports, neither of them has met in football since 1980. Rutgers has a basketball rivalry with Seton Hall University. Penn State and the University of Maryland are the two schools with which Rutgers was developing rivalries with in the Big Ten.

In the fall of 2007, six Rutgers New Brunswick/Piscataway NCAA Division I sports were discontinued by the university, including men's swimming and diving, men's heavyweight and lightweight crew, men's tennis, and men's and women's fencing. Some continued as club teams, while some were disbanded completely. The university claims this change was due to budget cuts, while others claim it was a politically motivated move designed to protest state funding changes.

In November 2012, the Rutgers Scarlet Knights, along with Louisville, Connecticut, and Cincinnati left the Big East to form the American Athletic Conference. Syracuse and Pittsburgh have decided to enter the Atlantic Coast Conference, while West Virginia entered the Big 12 conference, taking effect as of the 2012–2013 season. Rutgers decided to leave the American for the Big Ten Conference, effective July 1, 2014. Rutgers surpassed Penn State as the Big Ten's easternmost school.

On March 23, 2019, Nick Suriano and Anthony Ashnault won national titles for Rutgers Wrestling and provided Rutgers with their first 2 NCAA wrestling championships.

In 2021, Rutgers men's basketball team was selected to participate in the NCAA tournament. This marked the program's first appearance in the tournament since 1991.

In 2022, Rutgers men's lacrosse team was selected to participate in the NCAA Division I tournament. They defeated Harvard and the University of Pennsylvania to reach their first ever Final Four. Their season ended with a 17-10 loss to Cornell.

Notable people

Alumni

At Queen's College's first commencement in 1774, one graduate, Matthew Leydt, received his baccalaureate degree in a brief ceremony.

Rutgers alumni have been influential in many fields. Singer, athlete, attorney, and Civil Rights Movement activist Paul Robeson graduated in 1919 and is the namesake of the Paul Robeson Cultural Center on the Busch Campus, the Paul Robeson Library on the Camden Campus, and the Campus Center on the Newark Campus. Among the first students enrolled at Rutgers (when it was Queen's College), Simeon De Witt (A.B. 1776) became the Surveyor-General for the Continental Army (1776–1783) during the American Revolution and classmate James Schureman (A.B. 1775), served in the Continental Congress and as a United States senator. Two alumni have been awarded Nobel prizes— Milton Friedman (A.B. 1932) in economics, and Selman A. Waksman (B.Sc. 1915, M.Sc.1916) in Medicine. Poet Robert Pinsky (B.A. 1962) was appointed the nation's poet laureate and novelist Junot Díaz (B.A. 1992) awarded the Pulitzer Prize for Fiction in 2008.

Seven alumni have served as New Jersey governor; two as president of Rutgers; Garret A. Hobart (A.B. 1863) as Vice President of the United States; Louis Freeh (B.A. 1971, J.D. 1974) as director of the FBI; Frederick T. Frelinghuysen (A.B. 1836) a U.S. Senator, as U.S. Secretary of State. Alumnus Joseph P. Bradley (A.B. 1836) served for two decades as an associate justice of the Supreme Court of the United States and cast the tie-breaking vote on the bipartisan commission that decided the contested American presidential election in 1876. Diplomat Maria Fernanda Espinosa served as President of the United Nations General Assembly. Senators Elizabeth Warren (JD) and Bob Menendez (JD) both attended Rutgers Law School.

In business, alumni include: Bernard Marcus (B.S. 1951), founder of hardware retail company Home Depot; Bill Rasmussen (MBA 1960), founder of ESPN; and Duncan MacMillan (B.S. 1966), co-founder of financial data and media company Bloomberg L.P. In science and technology, alumni include: Peter C. Schultz (B.S. 1967), co-inventor of fiber optics; molecular geneticist Angela Christiano (PhD 1991); geneticist Stanley N. Cohen (B.Sc. 1956) who pioneered in the field of gene splicing; physician Howard Krein; and Louis Gluck (B.S. 1930) the "father of neonatology".

Alumni prominent in entertainment include actor James Gandolfini (B.A. 1983) (The Sopranos); chef Mario Batali (B.A. 1982); David Stern (B.A. 1963), former commissioner of the National Basketball Association; Henry Selick, film director (Disney's The Nightmare Before Christmas); actor Michael Sorvino; author Holly Black; actor Sebastian Stan (Captain America: The Winter Soldier); cartoon character Mr Magoo; actress Jessica Darrow (Encanto); voice actor John DiMaggio (Futurama, Adventure Time); soccer player/commentator Alexi Lalas, and actress Kristin Davis (Sex and the City).

Faculty
65,000 undergraduate and graduate students currently study at Rutgers, instructed by more than 9,000 full-time and part-time faculty and supported by more than 15,000 full-time and part-time staff members. Former law professor Ruth Bader Ginsburg (1933–2020) served as an associate justice of the Supreme Court of the United States. During his 20-year tenure at Rutgers, David Levering Lewis, a former history professor, was twice awarded the Pulitzer Prize for Biography or Autobiography (1994 and 2001) for both volumes of his biography of W. E. B. Du Bois (1868–1963) and was also the winner of the Bancroft Prize and the Francis Parkman Prize. Poet Gregory Pardlo won the 2015 Pulitzer Prize for Poetry, he is both an alumnus and faculty member at the Camden campus. Michael R. Douglas, a prominent string theorist and the director of the New High Energy Theory Center and winner of the Sackler Prize in theoretical physics in 2000. Noted chef and restaurateur Maricel Presilla taught in the history department at Rutgers. Avery Brooks, a Rutgers graduate, taught at Mason Gross School of the Arts. Former professor Ruth Chang is an expert in decision making and a fellow at Oxford. Literature scholar Ankhi Mukherjee now at University of Oxford won the Rose Mary Crawshay prize. Jerry Fodor, Zenon Pylyshyn, Stephen Stich and Frances Egan were awarded the Jean Nicod Prize in philosophy and cognitive science.

Many other members of the faculty have received the highest awards in their fields, including Guggenheim and MacArthur "Genius Award" fellowships, Pulitzer Prize winners, National Medal of Science and National Medal of Technology recipients, a National Endowment for the Arts "Jazz Master," amongst others. , 37 science, engineering and medical faculty are members of the four "National Academies"—the National Academy of Sciences, the National Academy of Engineering, the Institute of Medicine, and the National Research Council.Rutgers, The State University of New Jersey. "Rutgers Outstanding Thinkers: Members of the National Academies" . Retrieved October 29, 2013.

See also

 2011 Rutgers tuition protests
 The 2012 Project
 List of American state universities
 List of Rutgers University people
 List of Rutgers University presidents
 List of colleges and universities in New Jersey

References

Notes

Citations

Bibliography

 H.M. Berman, J. Westbrook, Z. Feng, G. Gilliland, T.N. Bhat, H. Weissig, I.N. Shindyalov, P.E. Bourne: The Protein Data Bank. Nucleic Acids Research, 28, pp. 235–242 (2000).
 Demarest, William Henry Steele. History of Rutgers College: 1776–1924. (New Brunswick, New Jersey: Rutgers College, 1924).
 History of Rutgers College: or an account of the union of Rutgers College, and the Theological Seminary of the General Synod of the Reformed Dutch Church. Prepared and published at the request of several trustees of the College, by a trustee. (New York: Anderson & Smith, 1833).
 Lukac, George J. (ed.), Aloud to Alma Mater. (New Brunswick, New Jersey: Rutgers University Press, 1966), 70–73.
 McCormick, Richard P. Rutgers: a Bicentennial History. (New Brunswick, New Jersey: Rutgers University Press, 1966). .
 Schmidt, George P. Princeton and Rutgers: The Two Colonial Colleges of New Jersey''. (Princeton, New Jersey: Van Nostrand, 1964).

External links

 
 Official Home of the Scarlet Knights
 Official Home of the Scarlet Raiders
 Official Home of the Scarlet Raptors
  1937–. 

 
1766 establishments in New Jersey
Colonial colleges
Educational institutions established in 1766
Rutgers
Land-grant universities and colleges
Universities and colleges in Camden County, New Jersey
Universities and colleges in Essex County, New Jersey
Universities and colleges in Middlesex County, New Jersey
Public universities and colleges in New Jersey
Robert A. M. Stern buildings